Jason Jones may refer to:

Sports
Jason Jones (baseball) (born 1976), American baseball outfielder
Jason Jones (footballer) (born 1979), Welsh professional footballer
Jason Jones (wide receiver) (born 1983), gridiron football wide receiver
Jason Jones (defensive end) (born 1986), National Football League player

Music
Jason Jones (musician) (born 1978), former lead singer of the band Drowning Pool
Jason Jones (country singer) (born 1994), country music artist
Jason Jones (The Voice singer)

Other
Jason Jones (actor) (born 1973), Canadian-American actor and comedian
Jason Jones (activist) (born 1964), Trinidadian activist
Jason Jones (activist/filmmaker) (born 1971), American film producer and anti-abortion activist
Jason Jones (programmer) (born 1971), computer game programmer, co-founder of Bungie
Jason Jones, suspected of an association with the murder of Jim Kitterman, another American in Baghdad
Jason Jones, bouncer, convicted of murder of Nisha Patel-Nasri in 2006